Kaj Frederiksen (21 September 1916 – 9 July 1991) was a Danish boxer who competed in the 1936 Summer Olympics.

He was born in Gørlev and died in Copenhagen. He was the twin brother of Viggo Frederiksen.

In 1936 he was eliminated in the second round of the flyweight class after losing his fight to the upcoming silver medalist Gavino Matta.

External links
profile

1916 births
1991 deaths
People from Kalundborg Municipality
Flyweight boxers
Danish male boxers
Olympic boxers of Denmark
Boxers at the 1936 Summer Olympics
Twin sportspeople
Danish twins
Sportspeople from Region Zealand